João Mansur (July 22, 1923 – February 22, 2012) was a Brazilian politician who served as the Governor of Paraná from July 4, 1973, until August 11, 1973. Mansur, who was the chairman of the Parana state legislature at the time, became governor when his predecessor, Governor Pedro Viriato Parigot, died in office. He served as governor for a little over one month until the appointment of his successor, Emílio Hoffmann Gomes.

Mansur was a merchant before entering politics. Mansur began his political career in 1951, when he was elected an alderman in Irati, Paraná. He also served as the city's mayor. In 1958, Mansur was elected to the state legislature, where he served for five terms.

Mansur died in Curitiba, Paraná, on February 22, 2012, at the age of 88. He was buried at the Cemitério Parque Iguaçu in Curitiba. Governor Beto Richa declared three days of official mourning.

References

1923 births
2012 deaths
Governors of Paraná (state)
Mayors of places in Brazil
Members of the Legislative Assembly of Paraná
People from Paraná (state)